Apache Commons Logging (previously known as Jakarta Commons Logging or JCL) is a Java-based logging utility and a programming model for logging and for other toolkits. It provides APIs, log implementations, and wrapper implementations over some other tools.

Log level 
The following table defines the log levels and messages in Apache Commons Logging, in decreasing order of severity. The left column lists the log level designation in and the right column provides a brief description of each log level.

Configuration 
Two basic abstractions, Log and LogFactory, are used in Apache Commons Logging.

Example 
Sample code may look like as follows:
package com.cascadetg.ch09;

import org.apache.commons.logging.Log;
import org.apache.commons.logging.LogFactory;
import org.apache.commons.logging.impl.Jdk14Logger;

public class LogGenerator
{
  // Note that you pass in an instance of this class to the
  // log generator. This allows you to find the messages
  // generated by this class.
  private static Log log = LogFactory.getLog(LogGenerator.class);

  public static void configJDKLogger()
  {
    try
    {
      ((Jdk14Logger)log).getLogger().setLevel(
java.util.logging.Level.ALL);
      ((Jdk14Logger)log).getLogger().addHandler(
(java.util.logging.FileHandler)Class
        .forName("java.util.logging.FileHandler")
        .newInstance());

      System.out.println("Added JDK 1.4 file handler");
    } catch (Exception e)
    {
      System.out.println("Unable to load JDK 1.4 logging.");
      e.printStackTrace();
    }
  }

  public static void main(String[] args)
  {
    configJDKLogger();
    System.setErr(System.out);

    System.out.println();
    System.out.println("Test fatal log");

    try
    {
      String foo = null;
      int x = 0 / (new Integer(foo)).intValue();
    } catch (Exception e)
    {
      log.fatal(e.getMessage(), e);
    }

    System.out.println();
    System.out.println("Test error log");

    try
    {
      Object foo = null;
      foo.toString();
    } catch (Exception e)
    {
      log.error(e.getMessage(), e);
    }

    System.out.println();
    System.out.println("Test warn log");
    try
    {
      Class.forName("com.cascadetg.NonexistantClass");
    } catch (Exception e)
    {
      log.warn("Can't find a non-existent class!");
    }

    System.out.println();
    System.out.println("Test info log");

    log.info("Starting app!");
    log.info("Quitting app!");

    System.out.println();
    System.out.println("Test debug log");

    if (1 > 2)
    {
      log.debug("1 > 2 evaluated true");
      if (10 % 2 == 0)
        log.debug("10 % 2 is 0");
      else
        log.debug("10 % 2 is not 0");
    } else
    {
      log.debug("1 > 2 evaluated false");
    }

    System.out.println();
    System.out.println("Test trace log");

    log.trace("Calling trace method.");
    log.trace("Calling trace method.");
    log.trace("Calling trace method.");
    log.trace("Calling trace method.");
    log.trace("Calling trace method.");

    System.out.println();
    System.out.println("Log test complete.");
  }
}

See also 

log4j
Chainsaw (log file viewer)

References

External links 

Commons Logging
Free software programmed in Java (programming language)
Log file formats
Software using the Apache license